Raymond Thomas Stoviak (June 6, 1915 – February 23, 1998) was an outfielder in Major League Baseball. He played for the Philadelphia Phillies in 1938. He was the last player to be struck out in a major league game at the Baker Bowl in Philadelphia, on June 30, 1938.

Stoviak graduated from Villanova College (now Villanova University) in 1938, where he quarterbacked the Wildcats for three years and led his team to a record of 22–4–2. He played for head coaches Harry Stuhldreher, one of the fabled Four Horsemen of Notre Dame, and Maurice J. "Clipper" Smith. Stoviak led the Wildcats to the Bacardi Bowl in Havana, played on January 1, 1937. There, Villanova battled Auburn to a 7–7 tie. He was inducted into Villanova's Varsity Club Hall of Fame on June 8, 1989.

During World War II, he was a first lieutenant in the United States Navy stationed at Chapel Hill, North Carolina, and Pensacola, Florida, where he coached baseball with Bob Kennedy and Ted Williams. In 1946, Stoviak was the backfield coach at the United States Merchant Marine Academy in Kings Point, New York, serving under head football coach William Reinhart. In 1947 he was appointed head football coach at athletic director at Arnold College in Milford, Connecticut. He also coached baseball at Arnold. After Arnold was absorbed by the University of Bridgeport in 1953, Stoviak was appointed football coach and mathematics faculty at Meriden High School in Meriden, Connecticut. He later served as assistant football coach at Yale University under Jordan Olivar.

Stoviak suffered a severe stroke in February 1994 and subsequently moved into the home of his daughter in Costa Rica where he died four years later. He became the first Major League Baseball player known to have died in Costa Rica.

Head coaching record

College football

References

External links

1915 births
1998 deaths
American football quarterbacks
Major League Baseball outfielders
Baltimore Orioles (IL) players
Bridgeport Purple Knights football coaches
Centreville Colts players
Philadelphia Phillies players
Villanova Wildcats baseball players
Villanova Wildcats football players
Yale Bulldogs football coaches
United States Navy officers
High school football coaches in Connecticut
United States Navy personnel of World War II
People from Westmoreland County, Pennsylvania
Baseball players from Pennsylvania
Coaches of American football from Pennsylvania
Players of American football from Pennsylvania
Military personnel from Pennsylvania